The écoles centrales (literally central schools) were schools set up in 1795 during the French Revolution to replace the college of art faculties in France's historic universities. The idea for them came from the Committee of Public Instruction and their main instigators were Joseph Lakanal and Pierre Daunou, though  Jean Henri Bancal des Issarts came up with the name for them. One work on their history states:

They were suppressed in 1802.

History

Decrees

7 ventôse year III

3 brumaire year IV

Establishment

Endgame

References

Bibliography (in French)
 J. Guillaume, Procès-verbaux du Comité d'instruction publique de la Convention Nationale, tome 5, 17 fructidor an II (3 septempre 1794) - 30 ventôse an III (20 mars 1795), p. 537-575, Imrimerie nationale, Paris, 1804 (online)
 Antoine Léon, Pierre Roche, Histoire de l'enseignement en France, Presses Universitaires de France (collection Que sais-je ? no. 393), Paris, 2012  ; p. 128
 Antoine-Louis-Claude Destutt de Tracy, Projet d'éléments d'idéologie à l'usage des écoles centrales de la République française, chez Pierre Didot l'aîné, Firmin Didot et Debray, Paris, an IX (online)
 Antoine-Louis-Claude Destutt de Tracy, Œuvres complètes tome 1, présentées par Claude Jolly : Premiers écrits - Sur l'éducation et l'instruction publique, Librairie philosophique J. Vrin, Paris, 2011 
 Sylvestre-François Lacroix, Discours sur l'instruction publique, prononcé à la distribution des prix des écoles centrales du département de la Seine, 29 thermidor an VIII ; suivi de notes sur l'état actuel et le régime des écoles centrales, Duprat, Paris, an VIII
 Élisabeth Liris, De l’Abbaye Sainte-Geneviève au Lycée Napoléon : l’École centrale du Panthéon (1796-1804), La Révolution française, cahiers de l'Institut d'histoire de la Révolution française, 2013, no. 4 (Pédagogies, utopies et révolutions (1789-1848)) (online)
 Enseignement républicain et innovation pédagogique : L’École centrale de l’Eure (1795-1804)

History of education in France
French Revolution
1795 establishments in France
1802 disestablishments in France